East Dane is an Anglo-Saxon ethnonym which was used in the epic Beowulf as a kenning for the Geats, the people of Götaland without Scania in southern Sweden.

It was also used in an Anglo-Saxon runic poem describing the first appearance of the god Frey (called Ing, see Yngvi):

Ing wæs ærest mid Eástdenum
gesewen secgum, oð he síððan eást
ofer wæg gewát. wæn æfter ran.
þus Heardingas þone hæle nemdon.

Ing was first amidst the East Danes
so seen, until he went eastward
over the sea. His wagon ran after.
Thus the Heardings named that hero.

In Scandinavian mythology (Ynglinga saga and Gesta Danorum), the first appearance of Frey was localised to Sweden and Old Uppsala, where he founded the Temple at Uppsala:

The Ynglinga saga:
Frey built a great temple at Upsal, made it his chief seat, and gave it all his taxes, his land, and goods. Then began the Upsal domains, which have remained ever since.

Gesta Danorum:
Also Frey, the regent of the gods, took his abode not far from Upsala, where he exchanged for a ghastly and infamous sin-offering the old custom of prayer by sacrifice, which had been used by so many ages and generations. For he paid to the gods abominable offerings, by beginning to slaughter human victims.

Since Dane was used as a generic expression for Scandinavian, it can be hypothesized that the name East Dane of the runic poem refers to Scandinavians living east of the Danes proper (i.e. Swedes and Geats).

References

Early Germanic peoples
Medieval Sweden